Ribeira River may refer to:

 Ribeira de Iguape River, in the states of  Paraná and São Paulo, Brazil
 Ribeira River (Paraíba), in the state of Paraíba, Brazil
 Ribeira River (Paraná), in the state of Paraná, Brazil